Bangla Sanglap may refer to–
Dialogue means Bangla Sanglap in some Indian languages (Hindi, Bengali etc.)
Sanglap Group Theater a Bengali theater group in Bangladesh since 18 June 1978.
Sanglap Kolkata a Bengali theatre group
Sanglap Bhowmik– a Bengali film editor